Terriera is a genus of fungi within the Rhytismataceae family. The genus contains 16 species.

References

External links
Terriera at Index Fungorum

Leotiomycetes